Daniel O. Mahoney was a member of the Wisconsin State Assembly.

Biography
Mahoney was born on June 8, 1854 in Moscow, New York. He died on September 21, 1944.

Career
Mahoney was a member of the Assembly during the 1893 and 1895 sessions. Other positions he held include County Superintendent of Vernon County, Wisconsin. He was a Republican.

References

External links

Geni.com

People from Livingston County, New York
People from Vernon County, Wisconsin
Republican Party members of the Wisconsin State Assembly
1854 births
1944 deaths
Burials in Wisconsin